Felicita Frai (Prague, 1909 – Milan, 2010) was a Czechoslovak painter.

Biography
After dropping out of university in her native city she moved to Italy, living first in Trieste and then Ferrara. Here she studied fresco painting under Achille Funi, collaborating with him in 1936 on the decoration of the Palazzo della Consulta. In 1938 she made her debut at the Venice Biennale, participating again in 1948. In the 1940s she went to live in Milan where she frequented Giorgio de Chirico’s studio and showed her work at all the editions of the Triennale from 1945 to 1954. She devoted herself to figure painting and the still life, but also to engraving and the illustration of books, such as Through the Looking Glass by Lewis Carroll (1947 Italian edition) and L'albero del riccio by Antonio Gramsci (1948).

Bibliography
 FERRATA Giansiro, MANZINI Gianna, MONTALE Eugenio, VALSECCHI Marco, Felicita Frai, Silvania editoriale d’arte, Milano 1973, pp. 131.
 Laura Casone, Felicita Frai , online catalogue Artgate by Fondazione Cariplo, 2010, CC BY-SA (source for the first revision of this article).

Other projects

Czechoslovak painters
20th-century Italian painters
1909 births
2010 deaths
Czechoslovak emigrants to Italy